Ricardo Amaro Uribe Oshiro  (born  9 October 1988) is a Peruvian footballer who plays as a midfielder for Real Garcilaso in the Torneo Descentralizado. He is the younger brother of Eduardo Uribe.

Club career
Ricardo Uribe began his senior career with Segunda División side Deportivo Aviación in 2008.

He then joined Deportivo Coopsol in January 2009. There he made 20 league appearances and scored two goals in the 2009 season.

Then in January 2010 he got the chance to play in the top-flight by joining Colegio Nacional de Iquitos. Uribe made his Torneo Descentralizado league debut on matchday 1 playing the start in the 3–1 loss away to Universidad San Martin. He scored his first goal in the Descentralizado in round 20 from a free kick in club's victory over Melgar.

He then joined newly formed side Real Garcilaso in January 2011.

International career
Uribe featured for the Peru U17 squad that participated in the 2005 FIFA U-17 World Cup.

References

External links

1988 births
Living people
Footballers from Lima
Association football midfielders
Peruvian footballers
Colegio Nacional Iquitos footballers
Real Garcilaso footballers
Peruvian Primera División players